Lake Qalghanlu (Persian: Daryāĉe Qalghanlu, قالغانلو دریاچه, Daryāche-ye Khan Kandi; Qalghanlu gölü) is the smallest natural lake in Iranian Azerbaijan. The lake is between the Khan Kandi village of Germi and the Azerbaijani border, and west of the southern portion of the Caspian Sea.

Specifications
Qalghanlo Lake has an approximate length of 70 meters and a width of 45 meters with an area of 3,150 square meters.

Gallery

Neighbors
Tulun, Iran
Khan Kandi
Azizlu

References 

Towns and villages in Germi County
Lakes of Iran
Endorheic lakes of Asia
Landforms of East Azerbaijan Province
Biosphere reserves of Iran